Gilles Bertould (born 16 May 1949) is a former French athlete who competed mainly in the 400 metres.

He competed for France in the 1972 Summer Olympics held in Munich, Germany in the 4 x 400 metre relay where he won the bronze medal with his team mates Daniel Velasques, Francis Kerbiriou, and Jacques Carette.

He continues to hold the French Junior record of 46.31, which he achieved at the Mexican Olympic Games.

References

Sports Reference

1949 births
Living people
French male sprinters
Olympic bronze medalists for France
Athletes (track and field) at the 1968 Summer Olympics
Athletes (track and field) at the 1972 Summer Olympics
Olympic athletes of France
European Athletics Championships medalists
Medalists at the 1972 Summer Olympics
Olympic bronze medalists in athletics (track and field)
Universiade bronze medalists for France
Universiade medalists in athletics (track and field)
Medalists at the 1970 Summer Universiade